The V6 PRV engine is an automobile petrol V6 engine that was developed jointly by Peugeot, Renault and Volvo Cars – and sold from 1974 to 1998.  It was gradually replaced after 1994 by another joint PSA-Renault design, known as the ES engine at PSA and the L engine at Renault.  It was designed and manufactured by the company "Française de Mécanique" for PSA, Renault and Volvo.

Corporate history
In 1966, Peugeot and Renault entered a cooperative agreement to manufacture common components. The first joint subsidiary, La Française de Mécanique (also called Compagnie Française de Mécanique or simply FM) was launched in 1969. The FM factory was built in Douvrin near Lens in northern France. The PRV engines are sometimes referred to as "Douvrin" engines, though that name is more commonly applied to a family of straight-fours produced at the same time.

In 1971, Volvo joined Peugeot and Renault in the creation of the PRV company, a public limited company (plc) in which each of the three manufacturers owned an equal portion. The company originally planned to build V8 engines, although these were later scrapped in favor of a smaller and more fuel-efficient V6.

The PRV engine could be seen as a V8 with two missing cylinders, having a 90-degree angle between cylinder banks, rather than the customary 60, but with crankpins being 120 degrees apart. The Maserati V6 of the Citroën SM followed a remarkably similar pattern of development.

The 1973 energy crisis, and taxes levied against engine displacement greater than 2.8 litres made large V8 engines somewhat undesirable, and expanded the market for smaller displacement engines.

Additionally, Renault needed a V6 engine to fit in its new model, the Renault 30. Renault's internal designation for the PRV was Z-Type.

Machinery for assembling the engines arrived at Douvrin in early June 1973, and buildings for producing the engines were finished in January 1974. The first PRV engines were officially introduced on 3 October 1974 in the Volvo 264. Adoption was swift, and the PRV V6 had been sold in at least five different models by the end of 1975.

In 1984, the first commercially available turbocharged PRV V6 was sold in the Renault 25 V6 Turbo. This was the first to be even-fire with split crankpins, and was the first of the second generation, and indeed EFI engine of any sort. Naturally aspirated 2963 cc and 2975 cc versions of both low- and high-compression 3-litre engines appeared in a number of Peugeot, Citroën and Renault cars until 1997.

While Renault were working forced induction into the PRV, Peugeot and Citroën developed their own 24-valve engines as an option in the 605 and XM respectively. The compression remained the same as the Renault 12v, but the pistons differed, as did some of the timing gear, and the heads were re-engineered to allow easier maintenance (the camshaft being fitted from the opposite end for example). This engine was however extremely expensive, and suffered cam wear problems. This was due to the exhaust valves sharing a single lobe, while each inlet valve had its own lobe. This was at least partially solved by the use of ceramic followers as one of a succession of recalls.

Meanwhile, French supercar manufacturer Venturi had been developing their own versions of the PRV. This used the low compression bottom end common to the Renault turbo engines, coupled to 24-valve cylinder heads with bespoke rockers and tappets.

Peugeot too allowed a small group of engineers to create a team for endurance racing, and after a few years the team grew to be called WM Peugeot. The ultimate version of the car used a low compression 3.0-litre bottom end coupled to bespoke twin-cam heads. It is the only DOHC PRV. This car still holds the top speed record at 24 Hours of Le Mans set in 1988.

Volvo began to withdraw from the PRV consortium in the late 1980s, shifting its powerplant reliance onto in-house inline engines.  Peugeot, Renault and Citroën continued using the PRV until 1997.

After producing 970,315 units, production of the PRV V6 was stopped on 15 June 1998.

Engineering

Uneven firing order
The original engineering work done on the V8 engine can still be seen in the resulting V6 engine: its cylinder banks are arranged at 90°, instead of the much more common 60°.  V8 engines nearly universally feature 90° configurations, because this allows a natural firing order. V6 engines, on the other hand, produce even firing intervals between cylinders when their two banks of cylinders are arranged at 60°. 90-degree V6 engines, like the PRV, experience uneven firing, which can be addressed using split crankshaft journals. 90° V6 engines are shorter (less tall, not less long) and wider than 60° engines, allowing lower engine bay hood/bonnet profiles.

First-generation PRV engines (1974–1985) featured uneven firing order. Second-generation PRV engines (introduced in 1984 in the Renault 25 Turbo) featured split crankshaft journals to create evenly spaced ignition events. Other similar design examples are the odd-fire and even-fire Buick V6 and the Maserati V6 seen in the Citroën SM.

PRV varieties
Z6W-A 700: 2849 cc carbureted version used in Renault Alpine V6 GT
Z7U-702: Used in the Renault 25 V6 Turbo
Z7U-730: turbocharged version used in the Renault Alpine V6 Turbo
Z7X-711: Used in the Eagle Premier/Dodge Monaco
Z7X-715: Used in the Eagle Premier/Dodge Monaco
Z7X-726: Renault Safrane Bi-turbo 
Z7X-744: Renault Alpine A610
ZM112: Carbureted version used in the Peugeot 504
ZMJ140: Fuel-injected version used in the Peugeot 504
ZMJ-159: Fuel-injected version used in the DMC DeLorean
ZN3J 154F: Fuel-injected (Bosch LH-Jetronic) version used in the Peugeot 505
ZN3J 154X: Catalyzed fuel-injected (Bosch LH-Jetronic) version used in the Peugeot 505
ZNJK: Fuel-injected version used in the Peugeot 604
ZPJ S6A: Fuel-injected version used in the Peugeot 605 and the Citroën XM
ZPJ4 SKZ: Fuel-injected multivalve version used in the Peugeot 605 and the Citroën XM
B27A: Carbureted version used in the Volvo 260
B27E: Fuel-injected version used in the Volvo 260
B27F: Low compression fuel-injected version used in the Volvo 260
B28A: Carbureted version used in the Volvo 260
B28E: Fuel-injected version used in the Volvo 260 and the Volvo 760
B28F: Low compression fuel-injected version used in the Volvo 260 and the Volvo 760
B280E: Fuel-injected version used in the Volvo 760 and the Volvo 960 for the 1st year in certain markets
B280F: Low compression fuel-injected version used in the Volvo 760, Volvo 780 and the Volvo 960 for the first year in certain markets

Specifications

PRV powered automobiles

The dates following each entry denote the introduction of a PRV V6-equipped models.

2458 cc:
Alpine GTA (September 1985–February 1991)
Renault 25 (1985–1995)
Venturi 180/200/210 (1987–1992)
2664 cc:
Alpine A310 (October 1976–1985)
Peugeot 504 coupé/cabriolet (1974–1983)
Peugeot 604 (March 1975–1984)
Renault 25 (1984–1988)
Renault 30 (March 1975–1984)
Talbot Tagora (1980–1983)
Volvo 260/264/265 (October 1974–1980)
Volvo 262C (1977–1980)
Volvo 363CS (1977, prototype)
2849 cc:
Alpine GTA (November 1984 – 1990)
DMC DeLorean (1981–1983)
Lancia Thema (1984–1992)
Panhard ERC
Panhard VCR
Peugeot 505 (July 1986–1992)
Peugeot 604 (1979–1985)
Peugeot P4
Peugeot Proxima (1986, prototype)
Peugeot Oxia (1988, prototype)
Renault 25 (1988–1992)
Renault Espace II (1991–1996)
UMM Alter II (90's)
Venturi 160 (1987–1992)
Venturi 260 (1989–1996)
Volvo 260/264/265 (1980–1982)
Volvo 262C (1980–1981)
Volvo 760/780 (February 1982–1991)
Volvo 960 (rare 1991 models)
2963 cc:
Alpine A610 (1993–1995)
Citroën XM (1993–1997)
Peugeot 605 (1990–1995)
Renault Espace III (1996–1998)
Renault Laguna I (1994–1997)
Renault Safrane (1992–1997)
2975 cc:
Alpine A610 (1991–1993)
Citroën XM (1989–1993)
Dodge Monaco (1990–1992)
Eagle Premier (1988–1992)
Peugeot 605 (1990–1995)
RJ Racing Helem V6 (1995, modified Renault Sport Spider)
UMM Alter II (90's)
Venturi 300 (1996–1998)
Venturi 400 (1994–1997)

PRV engines in racing
ALD C289 (1992 24 Hours of Le Mans endurance prototype)
Alpine A310 Group 4 & B/12
Alpine A610 GT2
Chevron B36 (1987 24 Hours of Le Mans endurance prototype)
Fouquet buggies
Peugeot 504 V6 Coupé Rallye Group 4
Peugeot P4 V6 Paris Dakar
RJ Racing Helem V6
Schlesser Original
UMM Alter II
Venturi 260LM, 400GTR, 500LM and 600LM
WM P series (1976-1989 24 Hours of Le Mans endurance prototypes, including P80 that finished at 4th place at 1980 24 Hours of Le Mans and the famous P88 that was known for breaking Mulsanne Straight speed record with 407 km/h (253 mph) at 1988 24 Hours of Le Mans)
Ultima Mk1/2/3

The PRV was also the basis for the 90° V6 engine used by Alfa Romeo in the 155 V6 Ti in the 1996 DTM/ITC season from Silverstone onwards. The engines in that series required the use of bank separation angle and cylinder bore spacing from a production based engine, and as a 90° V6 has greater room between banks than a 60° V6 for a more optimal induction system, Alfa Romeo used the PRV as a basis as it had been used in the Lancia Thema, a car which shared its platform with the Alfa Romeo 164, as well as the Fiat Croma and Saab 9000.

Other sources declare that the 90° V6 engine in 1996 Alfa Romeo 155 V6 Ti is based on a 2.6 L V8 from 1970 Alfa Romeo Montreal with 2 cylinders removed, as allowed by the rules, however the FIA homologation documentation shows the homologated production engine was a "2850cm³" capacity "V6" engine. The bore spacing of the Montreal engine was too close to be suitable for the 155 V6 Ti in any case. Limone invented the "Montreal V8" story to throw the press off the scent and to satisfy FIAT management who were unhappy that a non-FIAT group developed engine was being used.

See also
 List of engines used in Chrysler products

References

External links

Renault Alpine Owners Club provides specific information on Renault Alpine vehicles using the PRV V6.
ART – Alpine Renault Tuning provides tuning and performance parts for Renault Alpines using the PRV V6 turbo and non-turbo.
Peugeot PRV Older but useful reference.

PRV
PRV
PRV
PRV
PRV
V6 engines
Gasoline engines by model